The Knox Mine disaster was a mining accident on January 22, 1959, at the River Slope Mine in Jenkins Township, Pennsylvania.

The disaster occurred when workers were ordered to dig illegally under the Susquehanna River without proper safety precautions, creating a hole in the riverbed which caused the river to flood into the many interconnected mine galleries in the Wyoming Valley between the right-bank (western shore) town of Exeter, Pennsylvania, and the left-bank (eastern shore) town of Port Griffith in Jenkins Township, near Pittston. Twelve miners were killed. Plugging the hole in the riverbed took three days, and mitigation efforts created several new islands between the two towns and altered the western-side flow of the Susquehanna around these.

The coal industry in northeastern Pennsylvania had already been in decline at the time of the accident as fuel oil and natural gas became more popular forms of energy.

Accident 
The River Slope Mine, an anthracite coal mine owned by the Knox Coal Company, flooded when coal company management had the miners dig illegally out under the Susquehanna River. Tunneling sharply upwards toward the river bed without having drilled boreholes to gauge the rock thickness overhead, the miners came to a section with a thickness of about — was considered the minimum for safety. The insufficient "roof" cover caused the waters of the river to break into the mine.

It took three days to plug the hole in the riverbed, which was done by dumping large railroad cars, smaller mine cars, culm, and other debris into the whirlpool formed by the water draining into the mine. Eventually, an estimated  of water filled the mines.

Twelve mineworkers died; while 69 others escaped. Amedeo Pancotti was awarded the Carnegie Medal for climbing  up the abandoned Eagle Air Shaft and alerting rescuers, which led to the safe recovery of 33 men including Pancotti himself. The bodies of the twelve who died were never recovered, despite efforts to pump the water out of the mine. The victims were Samuel Altieri, John Baloga, Benjamin Boyar, Francis Burns, Charles Featherman, Joseph Gizenski, Dominic Kaveliski, Frank Orlowski, Eugene Ostrowski, William Sinclair, Daniel Stefanides, and Herman Zelonis.

The Knox catastrophe was less deadly than the Twin Shaft disaster in Pittston in 1896, which claimed 58 lives.

Aftermath and legacy 
Ten people were indicted in the disaster's aftermath, including the mine superintendent, Robert Dougherty; owner Louis Fabrizio; secret owner August J. Lippi, who was also the president of District 1 of the United Mine Workers; and three union officials. Six served jail time. After the disaster, the widows of the twelve victims did not receive death benefit payments from the Anthracite Health and Welfare Fund for more than four years.

January 22, 2009, marked the fiftieth anniversary of the Knox Mine Disaster, with an annual memorial mass at St. John the Evangelist Catholic Church in Pittston, Pennsylvania, and a ceremony held at the former St. Joseph's Catholic Church in Port Griffith, which is the site of a commemorative monument and a State Historic Marker erected in 1999 by the Pennsylvania Historical and Museum Commission. The church was closed in May 2008 owing to a consolidation of area parishes and put up for sale in July 2008. The property was purchased on January 15, 2009, exactly one week prior to the fiftieth anniversary, by Susan Baloga and John Baloga, the grandson of John Baloga, one of the twelve miners who perished in the event. The property is now the site of Baloga Funeral Home. The fiftieth anniversary also included a special program at the Anthracite Heritage Museum in Scranton, which organized an annual program on the disaster in January.

See also 

 Avondale Mine disaster

References

Further reading

External links 
"Knox Mine Disaster" page on UndergroundMiners.com
County historical article
Pittston holds remembrance of Knox Mine Disaster
U.S. Mine Safety Report
"Knox Mine Disaster" Pennsylvania Historical Marker
Documentary film

Anthracite Coal Region of Pennsylvania
Coal mining disasters in Pennsylvania
Disasters in Pennsylvania
Engineering failures
History of Luzerne County, Pennsylvania
January 1959 events in the United States
1959 disasters in the United States
1959 in Pennsylvania
1959 mining disasters